Main page: List of Canadian plants by family

Families:
A | B | C | D | E | F | G | H | I J K | L | M | N | O | P Q | R | S | T | U V W | X Y Z

Najadaceae 

 Najas flexilis — slender naiad
 Najas gracillima — threadlike naiad
 Najas guadalupensis — southern naiad
 Najas marina — holly-leaved naiad

Neckeraceae 

 Homalia trichomanoides — lime homalia
 Metaneckera menziesii
 Neckera complanata
 Neckera douglasii
 Neckera pennata
 Neomacounia nitida — Macoun's shining moss

Nelumbonaceae 

 Nelumbo lutea — American lotus

Notothyladaceae 

 Notothylas orbicularis
 Phaeoceros carolinianus

Nyctaginaceae 

 Abronia latifolia — yellow sand-verbena
 Abronia umbellata — beach sand-verbena
 Mirabilis hirsuta — hairy four-o'clock
 Mirabilis linearis — narrow-leaved umbrellawort
 Mirabilis nyctaginea — wild four-o'clock
 Tripterocalyx micranthus — smallflower sand-verbena

Nymphaeaceae 

 Nuphar lutea — yellow pond-lily
 Nuphar rubrodisca
 Nymphaea leibergii — dwarf water-lily
 Nymphaea odorata — American water-lily
 Nymphaea tetragona — pygmy water-lily

Nyssaceae 

 Nyssa sylvatica — black tupelo

Canada,family,N